This is a list of Broadway shows with 20 or fewer regular performances. The list only includes shows that had open-ended runs or limited runs that ended earlier than planned. The shows must have officially opened on Broadway, and thus productions that closed during previews are not included.

List 
Unless otherwise noted, the run count listed is for the original Broadway production of the show. M denotes a musical, P denotes a straight play, R denotes revue, D denotes a predominantly dance musical, and S denotes a special case.

Shows that closed during previews
The following shows started previews but did not officially open on Broadway:
Infidel Caesar (1962 play) — closed after 1 preview performance
The Freaking Out of Stephanie Blake (1967 play) — closed after 3 preview performances
Senator Joe (1989 musical) — closed after 3 preview performances
Breakfast at Tiffany's (1966 musical) — closed after 4 preview performances
Truckload (1975 musical) — closed after 6 preview performances
Bobbi Boland (2003 play) — closed after 7 preview performances
Rachael Lily Rosenbloom (And Don't You Ever Forget It) (1973 musical) — closed after 7 preview performances
Venus Is (1966 play) — closed after 7 preview performances
Face Value (1993 play) — closed after 8 preview performances
 One Night Stand (1980 musical) — closed after 8 preview performances
Who's Afraid of Virginia Woolf? (2020 revival) — closed after 9 preview performances
A Way of Life (1969 play) — closed after 9 preview performances
The Office (1966 play) — closed after 10 preview performances
Leda Had a Little Swan (1968 play) — closed after 14 preview performances
The Little Prince and the Aviator (1981 musical) — closed after 16 preview performances
Me Jack, You Jill (1976 play) — closed after 16 preview performances
Let My People Come (1976 revue) — closed after 128 preview performances

See also
List of the longest-running Broadway shows

References
Notes

Further reading

Broadway theatre
Shortest-running Broadway shows